This article lists the records of Neftçi PFK.

UEFA competitions
First UEFA club competitions: UEFA Cup Winners' Cup.
First match UEFA club competitions: Neftchi Baku 0–3 APOEL, UEFA Cup Winners' Cup, first qualification round, 10 August 1995.
First goal scored in the UEFA club competitions: Vidadi Rzayev, against PFC Lokomotiv Sofia, UEFA Cup, first qualification round, 17 July 1996.
First win in the UEFA club competitions: Neftchi Baku 2–1 PFC Lokomotiv Sofia, UEFA Cup, first qualification round, 17 July 1996.
First group match in the UEFA club competitions: Neftchi Baku 0–0 Partizan, UEFA Europa League, 20 September 2012.
Biggest win in the UEFA club competitions: Neftchi Baku 3–0 FC Zestafoni, UEFA Champions League, second qualification round, 17 July 2012.
Biggest defeat in the UEFA club competitions: Neftchi Baku 0–8 Widzew Łódź, in the UEFA Champions League, first qualification round, 23 July 1997.
Seasons first date UEFA club competitions: 21 June (2008–09).
Seasons last date UEFA club competitions: 6 December (2012–13).
Most appearances in UEFA club competitions: 24 appearances
 Rashad Sadiqov.

Top scorers in UEFA club competitions: 4 goals
 Rashad Sadiqov;
 Julius Wobay.

Non-UEFA competitions
First Non-UEFA club competitions: CIS Cup
First match Non-UEFA club competitions: Neftchi Baku 0–1 Skonto Riga, CIS Cup, group stage, 25 January 1993.
First win in the Non-UEFA club competitions: Neftchi Baku 1–0 Sitora Dushanbe, CIS Cup, group stage, 31 January 1995.
Biggest win in the UEFA club competitions: Neftchi Baku 4–1 Nebitçi Balkanabat, CIS Cup, group stage, 16 January 2005.
Biggest defeat in the UEFA club competitions: Neftchi Baku 0–8 Spartak Moscow, in the CIS Cup, group stage, 27 January 1993.

References
General
 Official Website 

Specific

Records